Doric language may refer to:

 Doric Greek, an Ancient Greek dialect
 Doric dialect (Scotland), a variety of the Scots language